O'Shaughnessy's Madagascar skink (Brachyseps gastrostictus) is a species of skink endemic to Madagascar.

References

Reptiles of Madagascar
Reptiles described in 1879
Brachyseps
Taxa named by Arthur William Edgar O'Shaughnessy